In many militaries, a platoon sergeant is the senior enlisted member of a platoon, who advises and supports the platoon's commanding officer in leading the unit.

Singapore
In the Singapore Armed Forces, a platoon sergeant serves as the bridge between the platoon commander and the rest of the platoon, leading the platoon in many assigned tasks and assuming command in the platoon commander's absence. In some platoons, there may be more than one platoon sergeant.

Platoon sergeants exercise authority over section commanders who are only responsible for the management of a given section in the platoon. Platoon sergeants work with the Company Sergeant Major and subordinate section commanders. They are responsible for the discipline and training of the men. The platoon sergeant is responsible for preparing the men for parades and ceremonies. In exercises and operations, he is in charge of logistics, medical aid, and ensuring that the formation of the platoon is maintained during movement to a mission objective.

For NSF soldiers (conscripts), platoon sergeants are selected as third sergeants. They are usually specialists who graduated with a Silver/Gold Bayonet whilst at the Specialist Cadet School, though it may not often be the case. NSFs who are in active units and who have shown exemplary conduct on and off the field can be recommended to attend the course and take up a NSF Platoon Sergeant Role. On completion of the platoon sergeant course at the Specialist and Warrant Officer Advanced School, they will assume their appointments. Promotion to the rank of 2SG will be determined by the parent unit. NSF platoon sergeants do not normally attain the rank of First Sergeant (1SG) before their national service period has concluded, although they may go on to achieve this rank during their annual reservist cycles.

For Regulars, they are usually first sergeants. It is a must to have completed their section commander tour before assuming the appointment.

United States

U.S. Army
In the United States Army, a platoon sergeant is usually a sergeant first class (E-7) and is the senior enlisted member of the platoon. From 1929 until 1942 (replaced by technical sergeant) and again from 1958 until 1988 (merged with  sergeant first class), the separate rank title of platoon sergeant existed (abbreviated PSGT or PSgt.).

The platoon sergeant is the primary assistant and advisor to the platoon leader (and acts as the platoon leader in his or her absence).  Unless the platoon leader has extensive prior experience as an enlisted member or warrant officer before being commissioned as a lieutenant, it is likely that the platoon sergeant will have a greater wealth of military experience due to the disparity in military service length between a new lieutenant and a sergeant first class (typically a platoon leader has less than three years of service, whereas a platoon sergeant has from 7 to 15 years of service).

However, service experience is not a prerequisite for commissioning and command. Rather, as has been since the beginning of professional armies, the privilege of and eligibility for command is usually predicated primarily on rank and is entrusted to those who have earned it, on the combined basis of: innate aptitude (leadership and management) and intelligence (intellectual and emotional); completed education (civil and military) and training (tactical and technical); and demonstrated skills (physical and conceptual) and competencies (practical and theoretical).

Therefore, the platoon is usually commanded by a commissioned officer (normally a second lieutenant) as his/her first real command position after commissioning. Nonetheless, the wise and successful newly commissioned officer takes full advantage of the experience of the platoon sergeant by readily seeking and accepting the advice and counsel of a more experienced soldier and leader. Therefore, the platoon sergeant functions as the crucial conduit of interface between the soldier and the officer by bringing the experience of a senior noncommissioned officer into a sort of "on-the-job training" for the junior company-grade officer, helping to enable the officer to prepare for subsequent increases in levels of command.

On occasion, when a sergeant first class is not available, either organically within the platoon or from another unit, a responsible Staff Sergeant (E-6) will probably be appointed to fill the platoon sergeant position instead.  Here is an excerpt from the Army's Field Manual titled "The Army Noncommissioned Officer Guide" (FM 7-22.7).

"While the 'Platoon Sergeant' is a duty position, not a rank, the platoon sergeant is the primary assistant and advisor to the platoon leader, with the responsibility of training and caring for soldiers. The platoon sergeant helps the commander to train the platoon leader and in that regard has an enormous effect on how that young officer perceives NCOs for the rest of his career.  The platoon sergeant takes charge of the platoon in the absence of the platoon leader.  As the lowest level senior NCO involved in the company METL [Mission Essential Task List], and individual tasks to soldiers in their squads, crews or equivalent small units."

U.S. Marine Corps    
In the United States Marine Corps, the billet of platoon sergeant in a rifle platoon is usually held by a staff sergeant (E-6). In scout sniper, reconnaissance, weapons (i.e., crew-served weapons), armored vehicle (e.g., tank, assault amphibian, light armored reconnaissance), field artillery (both headquarters and firing platoons), and air defense (viz., LAAD) platoons, a gunnery sergeant (E-7) is usually the platoon sergeant.

In 1929 the rank of platoon sergeant was officially authorized. During World War II the rank of platoon sergeant was a "line" grade while staff sergeant with a bar instead of an inverted arc, or "rocker," was a staff grade. The separate rank title of platoon sergeant was eliminated in 1946, with all NCOs at this grade converting to staff sergeant. As in the past, the platoon sergeant is in charge of taking care of the Marines and the platoon's operational control while advising the platoon commander.

See also
 Platoon
 Sergeant
 Non-commissioned officer
 Platoon guide

References

Military appointments
Non-commissioned officers